Charles Roux (biologist)
 Charles Roux (cyclist)